The 1974 Calgary Stampeders finished in 5th place in the Western Conference with a 6–10 record and failed to make the playoffs.

Regular season

Season Standings

Season schedule

Awards and records
CFL's Most Outstanding Defensive Player Award – John Helton (DT)

1974 CFL All-Stars
DE – John Helton, CFL All-Star
LB – Roger Goree, CFL All-Star

References

Calgary Stampeders seasons
1974 Canadian Football League season by team